A summer music festival is a musical festival held during the summer. Specific events include:

 Caramoor Summer Music Festival
 Ebrach Summer Music Festival
 Lake District Summer Music
 New Brunswick Summer Music Festival
 New York Summer Music Festival
 The Summer Music Festival at Roseberry
 Sitka Summer Music Festival
 Stratford Summer Music Festival
 Toronto Summer Music Festival

See also
 Summer music (disambiguation)
 Music festival